The list of Liechtensteiners is a list of notable people from or of the nation of Liechtenstein.

Princely family

Franz Joseph II, Prince of Liechtenstein, longest reigning monarch (1938–1989) in Europe from 1964 to 1984 
Prince Hans Adam II, current Head of State, one of the world's richest royals
Prince Alois of Liechtenstein (born 1968), regent since 2004
Sophie, Hereditary Princess of Liechtenstein

Politicians

Otmar Hasler, former prime minister
Mario Frick, in the Guinness Book of Records as the world's youngest Prime Minister when he was elected.
Ernst Joseph Walch, former Secretary of State
Klaus Tschütscher, former Prime Minister

Sports

Skiers
Marco Büchel (born 1971)
Paul Frommelt (born 1957)
Willi Frommelt (born 1952)
Ursula Konzett (born 1959)
Tina Weirather (born 1989)
Andreas Wenzel (born 1958), won one bronze and one silver Olympic medal 1980 and 1984, respectively for Alpine skiing.
Hanni Wenzel (born 1956), won two gold medals and one silver medal in the 1980 Winter Olympics and a bronze one 1976 for Alpine skiing.

Football players
Mario Frick (born 1974)
Nicolas Hasler (born 1991)
Peter Jehle (born 1982)
Wolfgang Ospelt (born 1965)

Racing
Fabienne Wohlwend (born 1997) (W Series)

Arts
Ida Ospelt-Amann (1899-1996), poet
Josef Rheinberger (1839–1901), composer
Hermine Rheinberger (1864–1932), writer

Other
Wolfgang Haas (born 1948), Archbishop of Vaduz, former Bishop of Chur
Peter Kaiser (1 October 1793 – 23 February 1864), historian, statesman
John Latenser, Sr. (1858–1936), architect